Acalyptris thoracealbella is a moth of the  family Nepticulidae. It is found in Kentucky, Ohio and Pennsylvania in the United States.

Adults have been recorded in May and July, suggesting at least two generations.

External links
Nepticulidae of North America
Image

Nepticulidae
Endemic fauna of the United States
Moths of North America
Moths described in 1873